is a Japanese idol boy band formed by Johnny & Associates in 2015. The group was previously a sub-unit of Johnny & Associates' pre-debut trainee group Johnny's Jr. SixTones made their official debut on January 22, 2020. They sold 6.24 million physical copies in Japan.

Name
Johnny Kitagawa, the late leader of Johnny & Associates had named the group "SixTones"; the name was initially named "Six Tones" but later changed to "SixTones" and pronounced "Stones", with the "ix" in "Six" being silent. The "stones" pronunciation refers to "diamond in the rough", where the group's potential emerges as its members continually polish and refine their skills. The name also refers to the six members, each with a distinctive tone, personality and sound.

Members 
  - leader

History

2011–2015: Pre-group formation
In 2011, shortly after the debut of Sexy Zone, the members performed as back dancers for A.B.C-Z and Hey! Say! JUMP. In February 2012, the group was selected to star in a Nippon TV drama while they were back dancing in A.B.C-Z's ABC Za (Stars) stage play. The drama, Shiritsu Bakaleya Koukou (lit. "Private Bakaleya High School"), was the first drama collaboration between Johnny's talents and AKB48's members. Although the drama was screened in a late-night time slot, it received a high average rating for the time slot of 2.8%, and so pursuing a movie sequel was decided upon. Members of the original cast reprised their roles in the sequel and the movie Shiritsu Bakaleya Koukou: The Movie (2012) was released in the Japanese box office in October 2012.  At this point, the six members were not officially formed as a unit. Fans of the six members addressed them as Bakareya6 or Bakareya-gumi unofficially during the airing of the drama.

In the same period, the six members had a direct discussion with Johnny Kitagawa, which led to announcement of the Johnny's Jr. Johnny's Dome theater〜SUMMARY〜 shows. At the year-end's Fresh Johnny’s Jr. IN Yokohama Arena concert, clips of the Shiritsu Bakaleya Koukou drama were shown together with the original soundtrack Shake It Up by Kis-my-ft2.

In January 2013, the six members performed a cover of SIX SENSES by KAT-TUN on The Shounen Club. This was the members' last performance together before “disbandment” of the unofficial Bakareya6 unit. In the following month, the group was split into a 2:4 formation, with Jesse and Hokuto Matsumura performing as a duo and the four members appearing in separate performances on The Shounen Club. Additionally, the previously announced six-member performance at the Live House Johnny’s Ginza was changed and the members split into the same 2:4 formation. Afterward, the members were rarely seen together as six on shows or in magazine appearances.

In August 2014, five of the members, excluding Jesse, performed at the "Johnny’s Ginza 2014" shows .   Around the same period, the six members performed Shake It Up by Kis-my-ft2 together at "Gamushara J's party‼ vol.4". This was their first performance as six after eighteen months. In a magazine interview afterward, however, Hokuto Matsumura and Taiga Kyomoto talked about the complicated feelings they had during the show. Both felt that the show was a closure to their Bakareya episode.

However, Gamushara J's party!! Vol. 6 was announced in the following month. The members consisted of Genki Iwahashi, Yuta Jinguji, and Yuta Kishi as well as the six members. Magazine reports of the shows were later published with mentioning of the “Bakareya-Gumi”  and interviews of the six members  for the first time in a long while.

Years later, when SixTones talked about their group formation, they revealed that many of the members were planning to quit their agency at that point. Shintaro Morimoto was planning to return to his studies to obtain a teaching license after graduating from high school. Yugo Kochi, Taiga Kyomoto and Juri Tanaka were considering their futures, too. SixTones also revealed that during the that stagnant period, the members were brought back together by Jesse, who had expressed the desire to work together as six once again.

2015: Formation of official unit, SixTones 
In The Shounen Club episode broadcast in January 2015, the six members together performed a cover of Hell No by KAT-TUN. This was the first performance together as six on the show after a two-year gap.

In April 2015, five of the members, excluding Taiga Kyomoto, performed in the Johnny's Ginza 2015 shows. Taiga Kyomoto was in the Elizabeth musical at that time and could not join the show.  In order to announce their group name as Six, Taiga Kyomoto rushed over from the Imperial Theatre to the Theatre Creation on 1 May 2015, where the Six members announced their formation as SixTones.

The group name was later changed to SixTones and read as Stones and officially announced in Shounen Club on 10 June 2015. In September 2015, SixTones starred as the main casts in the Shounentachi ~Sekai no Yume ga... Senso wo Shiranai Kodomotachi~ musical for the first time, together with Snow Man. They performed their first two original songs, Kono Hoshi No HIKARI and BE CRAZY, in the Shounentachi musical.

2016 
SixTones held concerts as part of Johnny's Ginza 2016 from 27 to 30 May 2016. In September 2016, SixTones starred as the main cast in the Shounentachi ~Kikippatsu!~ musical for the second time, together with Snow Man.

2017 
From 18 to 26 February 2017, SixTones and four Kansai Johnny's Jr. (Daigo Nishihata, Kōji Mukai, Ryusei Onishi and Ryūta Muro) held joint concerts together as part of the East SixTones × West Kansai Johnny's Jr. SHOW Battle. SixTones also held concerts in the Summer Station ~ Kimitachi ga~ KING'S TREASURE shows from 1 to 3 August 2017. In September 2017, SixTones starred as the main cast in the  Shounentachi ~ Born Tomorrow~ musical with Snow Man for the third consecutive year. The two groups also performed during Shounentachi LIVE (2017) in Aichi Prefecture, Hyōgo Prefecture, Wakayama Prefecture and Hiroshima that year.

2018 
Upon the opening of Johnny's Jr.'s official YouTube channel on 21 March 2018, SixTones were announced to be in charge of each week's Friday content for the channel. In July 2018, SixTones held concerts as part of Summer Paradise 2018, with four additional shows later announced in August 2018. 
 
In October 2018, it was announced that SixTones were chosen for YouTube's first Japanese Artist Promotion Campaign for emerging artists that YouTube launched in several countries. The staff working with SixTones on their weekly Johnny's Jr. Channel content recommended them to be part of the campaign. The president of the YouTube headquarters in California then contacted Johnny & Associates directly to offer SixTones the opportunity to be part of the campaign.

On November 5, 2018, SixTones released their first music video, "Japonica Style", as part of the campaign on the Johnny's Jr. Channel. The music video was produced by Hideaki Takizawa while the costuming and styling were provided by the woman's fashion magazine, CanCam. On November 16, 2018, the group held its first YouTube Livestream at YouTube Space Tokyo, which was also the first YouTube Livestream held by talents of Johnny & Associates. SixTones later went on to perform at Japan's first YouTube FanFest Music on December 11.

2019 
At the Johnny's Jr. 8.8 Festival~Tokyo Dome Kara Hajimaru~ on August 8, 2019, it was announced that SixTones would release their debut single in 2020. Additionally, the group also opened an official Instagram account and announced their graduation from Johnny's Jr. Channel with the opening of their own YouTube Artist Channel  at 10:00 p.m. JST the same day.

Together with Travis Japan, SixTones is the first talent group of Johnny & Associates to open an official Instagram account, as well as the first talent group of Johnny & Associates to have their own YouTube Channel.

2020: Debut 
SixTones made their debut on January 22, 2020, with a double A-side CD single with another Johnny's group Snow Man called "SixTones vs Snow Man" with SixTones' track being "Imitation Rain". "Imitation Rain" was composed and arranged by X Japan's Yoshiki, and sold 772,902 CD copies in a single day, with it eventually crossing one million in following days, topping the Oricon Chart. On July 22, 2020, SixTones released another album single titled "Navigator", which was used as the opening of The Millionaire Detective Balance: Unlimited. Another song, "New Era", was released on November 11, 2020, and was used as the first opening of Yashahime: Princess Half-Demon.

2021: 1ST 
SixTones released their first album, 1ST on 6 January 2021. The album was released in three editions: Rough Edition, Tone Colors, and the regular edition. The album topped both the Oricon Albums Chart and Billboard Japan Hot Albums Chart, selling over 467,000 copies in Japan in its first week. They released their second album, City, on 5 January 2022. City includes their fourth album single, "Boku wa Boku Janai Mitai Da", released on 17 February, 2021, and their fifth single, "Mascara", released on 11 August, 2021. "Boku wa Boku Janai Mitai Da" was used as the theme song for the movie LiarxLiar, which SixTonMatsumura Hokuto, played a lead role in. "Mascara" was written and produced by King Gnu's Tsuneta Daiki. One song from the album, "Rosy", was used as the theme song for the Japanese dub of Spider-Man: No Way Home.

2022: City 
SixTones released their second album, City, on 5 January, 2022. The album was released in three editions: the regular edition, first edition A and first edition B. The album topped the Oricon Albums Chart in the week after its release. 

On 1 January, 2022, SixTones appeared on the YouTube channel, The First Take, performing an orchestral arrangement of their debut song, "Imitation Rain". With over 120,000 people watching the premiere, they set a record on the channel for the most views during a premiere, as well as became the first group from Johnny & Associates to appear on the channel. On 12 January, they appeared on the channel a second time, performing a song from City, "Everlasting".

Discography

Studio albums

Video albums

Singles

Group concerts

References

External links
 

Japanese boy bands
Japanese idol groups
Japanese dance groups
Japanese hip hop groups
Japanese pop music groups
Vocal quintets
Johnny & Associates
Musical groups established in 2015
Sony Music Entertainment Japan
Musical groups from Tokyo
2015 establishments in Japan